The Samuel Curtis Johnson Graduate School of Management is the graduate business school in the SC Johnson College of Business at Cornell University, a private Ivy League university located in Ithaca, New York. It was founded in 1946 and renamed in 1984 after Samuel Curtis Johnson, founder of S.C. Johnson & Son, following his family's $20 million endowment gift to the school in his honor—at the time, the largest gift to any business school in the world.

The school is housed in Sage Hall and supports 58 full-time faculty members. There are about 600 Master of Business Administration (MBA) students in the full-time two-year (2Y) and Accelerated MBA (1Y) programs and 375 Executive MBA students. The school counts over 15,200 alumni and publishes the academic journal Administrative Science Quarterly.

History

The Johnson School traces its beginnings to the university's founding in 1865. University co-founder Ezra Cornell proposed a Department of Trade and Commerce for the new university, which was "a radical departure from the day's conventional notions about higher education," as this proposal was made "sixteen years before Joseph Wharton endowed the nation's first collegiate business school at the University of Pennsylvania." At a university faculty meeting on October 2, 1868, Cornell co-founder and first president Andrew Dickson White, suggested the creation of a professorship in bookkeeping in the context of a larger proposal: the creation of a "commercial college." In the meantime, the Agriculture College continued to have a Department of Agricultural Economics and the Arts College continued to have a Department of Economics.

Formal movements towards a business school began in 1914 when faculty in the NYS College of Agriculture (which today offers an undergraduate business major) convened the first meeting of the "Committee on a Commercial College." Led by economics professor Allyn Young, the committee recommended the creation of a "two-year graduate course leading to the Master's degree" in both business and public administration. Young had been trained at Harvard University, and the influence on the committee's discussion of its business school's creation only six years prior was apparent, as the committee's recommendations included instruction for graduate students only, selectivity in admissions, and integration into the larger university community.

The idea of a business school took a backseat to World War I and its effects on the Cornell population. Following the Armistice of 1918, third university president Jacob Gould Schurman called for the establishment of such a school, which he estimated would require $1 million of initial funding. However, financial difficulties surrounding the Great Depression would further delay its creation. 

In 1941, the university faculty recommended the creation of a School of Business and Public Administration, and it was unanimously approved on December 10, 1941, three days after the attack on Pearl Harbor. Cornell courted Paul M. O'Leary, who earned his doctorate at Cornell and was a member of Franklin D. Roosevelt's "brain trust," to be dean of the new school. O'Leary leveraged an offer to be dean of the business school at the University of Minnesota in negotiations for the Cornell position, ultimately signing for a salary of $9,000.

In 1946, Cornell University opened the School of Business and Public Administration, holding classes in McGraw Hall and charging $200 for tuition for the first year. The school awarded two degrees—MBA and MPA—and its primary national recruiters included the Guaranty Trust Company of New York, Eastman Kodak, DuPont, General Electric, AT&T, and IBM. In 1950 it gained acceptance of the Association to Advance Collegiate Schools of Business. O'Leary stepped down as dean of the business school in 1951 to become dean of the College of Arts and Sciences. Melvin G. deChazeau was appointed acting dean until 1954, when Edward H. Litchfield became dean. Under Lichfield's tenure, a Ph.D. program was established, the academic journal Administrative Science Quarterly was created, a joint JD/MBA program with the Law School was organized, and the school was renamed the Graduate School of Business and Public Administration. Litchfield left three years later for the chancellorship at the University of Pittsburgh and was replaced by C. Stewart Sheppard in 1957, followed by William D. Carmichael in 1962. In 1964, the school was relocated to Malott Hall, which was specifically designed to house it.

During this period faculty divisions began to emerge, with three distinct groups vying for resources: business management, public administration, and healthcare administration (the Sloan Program). In 1983, the faculty voted to end instruction in the latter two fields and to change the school's name to the Graduate School of Management. The public administration program moved to the NYS College of Human Ecology.  That same year, the school began offering a dual-degree MBA/MA in Asian Studies with Cornell's FALCON (Full-year Asian Language Concentration) program, to produce American MBAs with some knowledge of the Japanese language and culture gained through coursework in Ithaca and a required summer internship in Japan. The school also created an MBA/MEng, originally called the Program in Manufacturing Management (PIMM). At the same time, Curtis W. Tarr was appointed the dean of the school.

In 1984, Samuel Curtis Johnson, Jr. and his family donated $20 million to the school, which was renamed the S.C. Johnson Graduate School of Management in honor of Johnson's grandfather, Samuel Curtis Johnson, Sr., the founder of S.C. Johnson & Son, Inc. The endowment gift to the university was, at the time, the largest gift to any business school in the world. In 1989, Alan G. Merten was appointed dean of the Johnson School. The year 1995 saw the creation of the Johnson School's first website, as well as the launch of its first 12-month option class. Merten left in 1996 to be President of George Mason University.

In 1998, the school was relocated to the newly renovated Sage Hall which had previously served as a dormitory, the school started the student-managed Cayuga MBA Fund, and the Parker Center for Investment Research was established. In 1999, the JGSM began offering an Executive MBA. In 2004, the Center for Sustainable Global Enterprise was established. L. Joseph Thomas was appointed interim dean in 2007 and eventually the official dean in 2008. In Fall 2010, the school was rebranded in logo and in name: the Samuel Curtis Johnson Graduate School of Management at Cornell University, or simply Johnson at Cornell University or Johnson. In 2010, the Emerging Markets Institute was established.

In 2011, Johnson hosted Facebook-sponsored 3-Day Startup (3DS), an event where participants worked to start a technology company over the course of three days. Later that year, a Johnson team consisting of student portfolio managers in the school's $10 million Cayuga MBA Fund won second place in CNBC's "MBA Face-Off" edition of its Million Dollar Portfolio Challenge, a nine-week, real-time fantasy stock and currency trading competition.

In 2012, Soumitra Dutta became dean of the school, followed by Mark W. Nelson in 2016 after Dutta became dean of the new Cornell College of Business. In 2016, the Johnson School was placed under the same umbrella as other Cornell schools - the Charles H. Dyson School of Applied Economics and Management in the NYS College of Agriculture and Life Sciences and the Cornell University School of Hotel Administration - in the newly created College of Business that boasts nearly 3,000 students and 220 faculty - creating the country's third-largest business school faculty. In January 2017, Herbert Fisk Johnson III of S. C. Johnson & Son committed $150 million for the newly formed College of Business. In recognition of this gift, the college was named the Cornell SC Johnson College of Business.

Campus
Johnson is housed entirely in Sage Hall, a 19th-century High Victorian Gothic building which was originally built as a women's dormitory. It is located near the center of Cornell's main campus, across the street from the Cornell School of Hotel Administration and the four-diamond Statler Hotel. Inside Sage are a management library, a café, an atrium, classrooms, an executive lounge, a trading floor, student and faculty lounges, and a parlor. There are 38 breakout rooms and two phone booths. The building also has showers, shoe shining, and out-service dry cleaning. Offices are provided for all faculty and doctoral students, and MBA students are all assigned a locker.

The Boas Trading Room has technology providing real-time stock quotes, international data feeds, and financial analysis software and data valued at more than $1.8 million per year in licensing fees.

In 2015, the City of Ithaca's Planning board approved the construction of a six-story office/classroom building to rise at 209-215 Dryden Road in Collegetown, Ithaca that will house the Samuel Curtis Johnson Graduate School of Management upon completion. The business school will also utilize classrooms and offices at Cornell's Roosevelt Island campus upon completion of construction.

MBA program

Johnson offers a two-year full-time MBA program, which consists of one semester of mandatory courses (core), one semester in immersion, and an optional second-year concentration. Unlike other MBA programs whose mandatory courses occupy the entire first year, Johnson utilizes an intense first-semester core model, allowing students to engage in an immersion (concentration) and specialize before interviewing for summer internships. Students who do not have a business background before matriculating at Johnson may attend a week-long MBA math boot camp to get up to speed, and orientation consists of a two-week leadership course that culminates in the Johnson Outdoor Experience (JOE), a two-day adventure-based activity in the Finger Lakes foothills. For the Class of 2018, the number of applications jumped from 1,704 to 1,960, a 13.1% increase over the previous year.  Overall, the program enrolled 284 students, up from 274 for the previous class.  Despite this increase, the program is harder to get into, with the acceptance rate dropping from 32.4% to 27.3%.  Entrance statistics for the Class of 2018 include an average score of 700 on the GMAT and a median of five years of work experience. The student body is international and diverse, with 38% of students holding citizenship outside the United States. Women comprise 31% of the Class of 2018.

The core curriculum consists of one semester, divided into two halves. The first half focuses primarily on the internal aspects of the company and includes the courses Managing and Leading in Organizations 1, Microeconomics for Management, Financial Accounting, and Marketing Management. The first half then culminates in the Marketing Case Competition, sponsored by S.C. Johnson & Son. The second semester focuses on the external aspects and includes the courses Statistics for Management, Managerial Finance, and Strategy. This half culminates each year in the Integrative Case Competition, sponsored by Citi.

The elective curriculum can be chosen from over 80 courses within Johnson and over 4,000 offered across the Cornell campus. Within Johnson, the diverse selection includes courses such as Applied Portfolio Management, Behavioral Finance, Estate Planning, Power and Politics, Corporate Social Responsibility, Strategy & Tactics of Pricing, Entrepreneurship & Private Equity, Six-Sigma Quality & Process Implementation, and International Mergers and Acquisitions. Johnson students are allowed to matriculate in graduate-level courses in any Cornell college, including Cornell Law School, Cornell School of Hotel Administration, NYS School of Industrial & Labor Relations, and Cornell College of Engineering. Elective curriculum students can also complete a field study or independent student research project instead of a class. Field studies allow students to work together in a team closely with faculty members to launch a product, develop new businesses, or research a real-world issue. Independent student research projects provide an opportunity for a student to work with a faculty member to develop deep insights on a particular topic of interest. These options allow students to create a second-year curriculum that is aligned with their personal and professional interests.

MBA students at Johnson are graded on a curve, with fixed grade point averages set at 3.3 for core courses and 3.5 for electives. In most courses, the grade consists of roughly 10% class participation, 10 percent individual case assignments, 40 percent exams, and 40 percent team presentations or papers. To graduate, students must have grade point averages of at least 2.7 overall and 2.5 in core courses. If a student drops below or near these thresholds, he or she receives an academic warning. The student is offered help in the form of academic counseling and tutors to improve academic performance. For the Class of 2016, 94 percent of students had job offers at graduation, with compensation packages including a $121,000 annual salary and a $30,000 signing bonus, on average.

Immersion learning & Concentrations

A unique aspect of the Johnson MBA experience is a completion of an intense, hands-on semester of an integrated course and fieldwork in a specific industry or career interest, before setting out for a mid-MBA summer internship. Immersions consist of interrelated electives, several site visits to regional companies, and live cases.

The Johnson curriculum offers 8 immersions:
Capital Markets and Asset Management (CMAM)
Digital Technology (DTI)
Investment Banking (IBI)
Managerial Finance (MFI)
Semester in Strategic Operations (SSO)
Strategic Marketing (SMI)
Sustainable Global Enterprise (SGE)
Customized

Students may also choose to pursue up to two optional academic concentrations, in Depth or Breadth, during their second year of the program. For Depth, these include consulting, entrepreneurship, leadership & ethics, global business management, and sustainable global enterprise. For Breadth, these are corporate finance, financial investing, financial analysis, marketing analytics, marketing management, private equity, and strategy.

Accelerated, joint, and exchange programs
 Accelerated MBA (AMBA)
 Joint program with Cornell College of Engineering (MBA/MEng)
 Joint program with Weill Cornell Medical College (MBA/MD)
 Joint program with Cornell School of Industrial & Labor Relations (MBA/MILR)
 Joint program with Cornell Law School (MBA/JD)
 Joint program with Cornell College of Architecture, Art, and Planning (MBA/MPS)
 Joint program with Cornell Institute for Public Affairs in the NYS College of Human Ecology (MBA/MPA)

For those with advanced science or technical degrees, Johnson offers a one-year Accelerated MBA. AMBAs begin in May and graduate in May of the following year. AMBAs finish their core in the summer and join the second year MBAs in the fall. About 12 percent of the student body chooses to enroll in a dual degree program. The MBA/JD program has 3- and 4-year tracks, and the MBA/MPS program is for those who want to specialize in real estate. The MBA/MILR is a 2 1/2 program and has been termed the "crown jewel for aspiring human resources professionals." Johnson also has MBA exchange programs with 21 universities in Europe, Asia, and Latin America.

Doctoral program
Johnson offers a Doctor of Philosophy in the field of management, with primary concentrations in five areas:
Accounting
Finance
Marketing
Management and Organizations
Production and Operations management
 
Doctoral students select two minor areas of concentration in addition to their primary field. Secondary fields offered by Johnson include behavioral science, managerial economics, and quantitative analysis; however, students may select a minor concentration outside of Johnson if desired. The program is small, with about 40 students in residence at any given time. Students are provided a full tuition waiver, a stipend, and health insurance.

The doctoral program takes at least four years to complete, and the average time spent is five years. Students' first examination, admission to candidacy, is taken at or near the conclusion formal course work (typically following year three). This examination ascertains competence in students' chosen field and is administered in written and oral components. The second examination is a thesis defense, which is administered once the dissertation is complete.

For 2010, Johnson's Ph.D. program was ranked #1 for experimental financial accounting. For finance, Johnson's Ph.D. program was ranked #6 according to a 2006 study.

Executive MBA
Johnson has three off-campus Executive MBA programs:

 Cornell Executive MBA in Metro NY
 Cornell Executive MBA Americas
 Cornell Executive MBA/MS in Healthcare Leadership

Established in 1999, the Cornell Executive MBA in Metro NY is based in New York, NY. This program uses a traditional classroom setting at the Cornell Tech campus located on Roosevelt Island. Classes are held every other weekend, all day Saturday and Sunday morning, in addition to four residential sessions on the Cornell University campus. The program duration is 22 months. For 2010, Johnson's Executive MBA program was ranked #24 worldwide by Financial Times.

In 2005, Johnson launched the Cornell Executive MBA Americas program (originally called the Cornell-Queens Executive MBA program) in partnership with Queen's University in Kingston, Ontario. This program organizes participants into teams of 6-8 people in cities across the US, Canada, and Latin America, linking these teams via multi-point, interactive video conferencing for class sessions. Classes are typically held three Saturdays per month, in addition to three residence sessions on the Cornell and Queen's university campuses. Graduates earn two MBAs, one from each institution, and the program duration is 17 months.

In September 2016, Weill Cornell Medicine and the Samuel Curtis Johnson Graduate School of Management announced a new dual-degree program that will provide the next generation of health care leaders with a broad set of skills for success in a rapidly changing environment. Students participating in the two-year  Healthcare Leadership program will receive a Master of Science degree from the Weill Cornell Graduate School of Medical Sciences and an MBA from Johnson. The program will focus on health care throughout the United States, in particular, health care systems that are experiencing vast changes in structure, payment, and regulatory requirements. Program duration is 20 months (with breaks), consisting of two semesters per year (fall and spring). You will take courses for ten weekends per semester at the Weill Cornell Medicine campus in New York City.

In addition to formal education programs, Johnson offers tailored executive education training sessions, both on- and off-campus.

Organization, research, and programs
Johnson courses are organized under nine academic departments: accounting, communications, economics, entrepreneurship, finance, global business, management and organizations, marketing, operations management, and technology. Johnson's interdisciplinary centers include the Center for Leadership, the Center for Manufacturing Enterprise, the Center for Sustainable Global Enterprise and the Parker Center for Investment Research.

The Center for Sustainable Global Enterprise promotes various sustainability issues and enables students to have greater insights and knowledge in working for sustainability developments and causes.

The Emerging Markets Institute was founded in 2010 to investigate the role of emerging markets in the global economy, and to educate current and future business leaders in this area. The Institute brings together preeminent practitioners and academics from around the world to develop the next generation of global business leaders and create the premier research center on the role of emerging markets in the global economy.

Johnson publishes top-tier academic journal Administrative Science Quarterly (ASQ). For 2007, ASQ had the highest "article influence score" according to Eigenfactor, and it was ranked as the #16 academic journal in business by Financial Times.

Since 2001, Johnson has also hosted its annual MBA Stock Pitch Challenge (SPC), a 12-hour competition in which teams of finance students from twelve top MBA programs prepare and present buy/hold/sell recommendations and vigorously defend them. The names of the winning schools are inscribed on the Jack M. Ferraro Trophy. The winningest school is Kellogg, which has claimed first place three times (2004, 2005, 2006). The most recent winner is Chicago Booth (2010).

People

Faculty

Professors at Johnson include former school dean Robert J. Swieringa, member of the board of directors for General Electric; author and The New York Times columnist Robert H. Frank; Maureen O'Hara, who was the first female president of the American Finance Association; 
and Robert Jarrow, co-author of the Heath–Jarrow–Morton (HJM) framework for pricing interest rate derivatives.

Alumni

The school's graduates have served in executive leadership positions for numerous corporations. Alumni include Kraft Foods CEO Irene Rosenfeld (Ph.D. '80), Aetna CEO Mark Bertolini (MBA '84), Silicon Valley venture capitalist Mary Meeker (MBA '86), Ocean Spray CEO Randy Papadellis (MBA), co-founder of PeopleSoft David Duffield (MBA '62), Strategy& Middle East Chairman Joe Saddi (MBA '83), former Chevron CEO Ken Durr (MBA '60), former Cargill CEO Warren Staley (MBA '67), former CEO of Emerson Charles F. Knight (MBA '59), former Applied Materials CEO James C. Morgan (MBA '63), Rock and Roll Hall of Fame President Terry C. Stewart (MBA '72), Sprint Nextel CEO Dan Hesse (MBA '77), BP CFO Byron Grote (Ph.D. '81), Comcast CIO Andrew Baer (MBA '82), S.C. Johnson & Son CEO Fisk Johnson (MBA '84), Henry Ford Hospital CEO Nancy Schlichting (MBA '79), and Priceline.com CEO Brett Keller (MBA '97).

Johnson graduates are represented in academia and government by Robert S. Kaplan (Ph.D. '68), HBS professor, former Dean of the Tepper School of Business at Carnegie Mellon, and co-creator of the balanced scorecard; Robert Sullivan (M.S. '68), Dean of the Rady School of Management at UC San Diego; Ned C. Hill (Ph.D. '76), 7th Dean of the Marriott School of Management at Brigham Young University; and John Hillen (EMBA '04), former Assistant Secretary of State.

Fictional alumni include Christina Pagniacci, portrayed by Cameron Diaz, in Any Given Sunday and Alicia Mendoza in Grand Hotel.

See also

List of United States business school rankings
List of business schools in the United States
Ivy League business schools
List of deans of the Johnson Graduate School of Management
Charles H. Dyson School of Applied Economics and Management, Cornell's undergraduate business school

Notes

References

External links

Cornell University
Colleges and schools of Cornell University
Business schools in New York (state)
Educational institutions established in 1946
Ivy League business schools
1946 establishments in New York (state)